= Constituency PSW-158 =

Reserved constituency of the Provincial Assembly of Sindh, Pakistan

PSW-158
- Provincial Reserved constituency for the Provincial Assembly of Sindh

Current constituency

PS- 129 (Karachi-XXXXI) is a Constituency reserved for a female in the Provincial Assembly of Sindh.

== See also ==
- Sindh
